Isaiah Ross may refer to:

Doctor Ross, Isaiah "Doc" Ross. (1925–1993), American blues musician 
Isaiah Ross (American football) (born 1981), American football guard
Isaiah Ross (basketball) (born 1996), American basketball player